Enrique Araújo Álvarez (born 3 October 1995) is a Paraguayan footballer who plays for Nacional and the Paraguay national under-20 football team.

Career
Araújo debuted in 2014 with the Nacional and since its debut achieved very many continuity.

International career
he was summoned for Paraguay national under-20 football team   to play 2015 South American Youth Football Championship.

References

External links
 
 
 

1995 births
Living people
Paraguayan footballers
Paraguay under-20 international footballers
Club Nacional footballers
2015 South American Youth Football Championship players
Association football wingers